Idy Hegnauer (12 September 1909 – 19 November 2006) was a Swiss nurse and peace activist, who worked for Service Civil International.

Personal life
Hegnauer was born in Obfelden, Switzerland. She was the daughter of Jakob Häberling, who worked as a carpenter, and Marie. Hegnauer was a Quaker. She died in 2006 in Affoltern am Albis, Switzerland.

Career
During the Spanish Civil War, Hegnauer enlisted in the Service Civil International (SCI), and worked in Valencia. In Spain, she met her future husband, Ralph Hegnauer, who was also involved in SCI. 

After the Second World War, Hegnauer worked with the American Friends Service Committee during the Israeli–Palestinian conflict. She helped villagers in Tur'an, Israel, providing them with medical assistance. 

In 1960, she did a presentation on Algerian refugees in Tunisia, whilst working in the country during the Algerian War. Hegnauer helped to raise 900,000Fr. for the SCI. 

After the Second World War, Hegnauer also worked in Greece, India, Austria and Yugoslavia. From 1980–1984, she worked at a children's hospital in Affoltern am Albis, Switzerland.

See also
 List of peace activists

References

1909 births
2006 deaths
Swiss nurses
Swiss humanitarians
Swiss pacifists
People from Zürich District
Swiss Quakers